Laurent Simutoga (born ) is a New Caledonian rugby union prop from Wallis and Futuna. He played for Paris and La Rochelle in the French Top 14 before an injury forced his early retirement from professional sport. He was educated at Lindisfarne College in New Zealand in 2005-06, during which time he played for Hawke's Bay Academy. Before moving to France, Simutoga also represented Hawke's Bay in the Under 18 and Under 20 age groups. In 2007 he represented France in the Under 21 age group.

Personal life
Born December 8, 1987 in Noumea, New Caledonia, Simutoga is the maternal grandson of Pelenato Fuluhea, who served as King of Wallis and Futuna between 1947 and 1950. He completed his secondary education at Lindisfarne College in New Zealand after being awarded a sporting scholarship. Following his retirement from professional rugby in France, Simutoga returned to take up residence in New Zealand.

References

External links
ESPN Scrum Profile
Try Line Profile
L'equipe Profile (French)
Rugbyrama Profile (French)

1987 births
Living people
French rugby union players
Rugby union props
Rugby union players from Wallis and Futuna
Stade Rochelais players
People educated at Lindisfarne College, New Zealand